The Tumansky R-25 is a turbojet engine, which is seen as the ultimate development of Tumansky R-11. It was designed under the leadership of Sergei Alekseevich Gavrilov.

Design and development
The Tumansky R-25 was designed as a replacement for Tumansky R-13 in MiG-21 fighters. R-25 is a two-spool axial-flow turbojet featuring a new compressor with increased overall pressure ratio and airflow, variable two-stage afterburner, and greater use of titanium.

The R-25 jet engine's specialty was the addition of a second fuel pump in the afterburning stage. Activating the ЧР (rus. "чрезвычайный режим" - emergency mode) booster feature allows the engine to develop  of thrust under  of altitude. The limit of operation is 2 minutes in practice and in war, as further use causes the engine to overheat and potentially explode. Use of EPR requires engine take-out inspection upon landing and every minute of its use counts as one full hour of engine runtime on the logbook. This further shortens the already limited cycle time of Soviet made engines between industrial-level overhauls and adds great cost.

The R-25 engine was used on the MiG-21bis and the Sukhoi Su-15bis. A total of 3,200 R-25 were built between 1971 and 1975. The engine was also built under license by HAL in India for its fleet of MiG-21bis.

Specifications (R-25-300)

See also

References

External links

 R-25 on LeteckeMotory.cz (cs)

Tumansky aircraft engines
1970s turbojet engines